James Tate Ellington (born April 17, 1979) is an American actor. He portrayed Aidan Hall, the best friend of Tyler Hawkins (Robert Pattinson) in the 2010 romantic drama film Remember Me. Ellington starred as Oliver Hunt in The Elephant King (2006), and has appeared in television shows such as The Unusuals, Rescue Me, The Good Wife, and Don't Trust the B---- in Apartment 23. He appeared in the 2009 Broadway production of The Philanthropist, which starred Matthew Broderick. He is best known for his role as FBI recruit Simon Asher on the ABC thriller Quantico. Beginning September 25, 2017, Ellington joined the main cast of NBC's new drama The Brave. He played Noah Morgenthau in the military thriller, which was one of the first two new series announced by NBC for the 2017–18 season.

Early life
Ellington is from Madison, Mississippi, the son of Deborah (Cochran) and James R. Ellington, who own a residential construction company. He received his high school education at the private Madison-Ridgeland Academy, in Madison, where he graduated in 1997. While at MRA, he was a starting center for the school's football team for three seasons.

Upon graduation from MRA, Ellington enrolled as a double major in art and theater at the University of Mississippi (also known as "Ole Miss"), after turning down a scholarship to the Savannah College of Art and Design. He graduated from Ole Miss with a bachelor's degree in theatre performance and was a member of the Sigma Chi fraternity.

Awards
Ellington won Best Actor for his role in The Elephant King at the 2006 Brooklyn International Film Festival.

Personal life
On May 20, 2012, Ellington married casting director Chrissy Fiorilli at the Dixie Gin in Shreveport, Louisiana.

Filmography

Theatre

References

External links
 
 

1979 births
21st-century American male actors
Male actors from Mississippi
American male film actors
American male stage actors
American male television actors
Living people
People from Madison, Mississippi
University of Mississippi alumni